James McDaniel Perkins (January 8, 1863 – October 29, 1926) was an American politician who served as the mayor of Denver, Colorado from 1913 to 1915.

References

Mayors of Denver
1863 births
1926 deaths